The phrase Obscuris vera involvens means "Truth is enveloped by obscurity". It is from Virgil's Aeneid (VI, 100).

It is also found on an engraving on the title page of Francis Bacon's Wisdom of the Ancients (1641 French edition).

The phrase is inscribed on Athena's shield and explains the imagery there: the sun (truth) enveloped in clouds (obscurity), but shining through.

See also 
 Obscurantism

External links
 Worldwide school library Aeneid (fifth paragraph)
 Picture of engraving on Wisdom of the Ancients (Francis Bacon Research Trust)

Latin words and phrases